Hilmar Cheese Company is a cheese and whey products manufacturer headquartered in Hilmar, California, United States. The privately owned company has over 1000 employees and specializes in the mass production of Monterey jack, pepper jack, colby, colby-jack, flavored jacks, mozzarella, Hispanic and cheddar cheese. As of 2011, Hilmar Cheese processes two million gallons of milk per day, producing over two million pounds of cheese per day. The company's Hilmar facility produces more cheese per year from a single site than any other cheese manufacturer in the world.

History
The company was founded in 1984 by 12 families located in Hilmar, California; it began production in 1985. Hilmar Ingredients, a division of Hilmar Cheese Company, was founded in 2004 to market the company's whey products to the world.  It currently produces over half a million pounds of whey protein and lactose powder per day and ships to over 40 countries worldwide. 

In March 2006, Hilmar cheese settled a lawsuit with the Central Valley Water Quality Control Board over alleged violations of process water treatment and waste discharge. The settlement amounted to $3 million, most of which will be put toward an environmental study. However, it allows the company to continue with its current process water discharge.

In 2007, Hilmar Cheese opened a cheese and whey protein processing plant in Dalhart, Texas. This plant is the company’s first processing plant outside its Hilmar, California, facility and corporate headquarters.

In 2014, Hilmar Cheese opened a milk powder processing plant in Turlock, California. This plant is the company’s second processing plant outside its Hilmar, California facility and corporate headquarters.  On April 17, 2019, Hilmar Cheese entered into an Agreement with California Dairies, Inc. to sell its Turlock milk powder processing plant.

In late 2023, Hilmar Cheese is scheduled to open a new $550 Million cheese and whey protein processing plant in Dodge City, Kansas, and groundbreaking is expected to happen in summer 2021.

Programs
Hilmar Cheese also helps their local residential student by rewarding them with scholarships. The student must be involved with the community in volunteering and must be academically advanced and lastly must have financial need. The scholarship program has 3 different categories so that different types of students with different backgrounds can also benefit. First is for the children whose parents work for the Hillmar Cheese Company, the second category is for the students living in agricultural counties and lastly, the third one is for the kids who are dedicated to agriculture, and they do not need to be affiliated with the company. Every year this scholarship is available and 35 students will each be granted $1,500 towards their college fund.

References

External links
 
 Settlement with Central Valley Water Control Board

Privately held companies based in California
Dairy products companies in California
Companies based in Merced County, California
1984 establishments in California
Food and drink companies established in 1984
American companies established in 1984